Granite Mansion was a historic home located at Newark in New Castle County, Delaware.  It was built in 1844, and was a three-story, three-bay, cubic stuccoed stone building with a flat roof in the Greek Revival style.  It had a rear kitchen wing.  The house was renovated in 1924 in the Neoclassical style, to add a two-tiered Corinthian porch on the east elevation and a Doric Porte-Cochere on the west elevation.  Also on the property were a small stuccoed spring house and one-and-a-half-story frame and stucco building dated to 1924. The house has been demolished and the property occupied by the First Presbyterian Church of Newark.

It was added to the National Register of Historic Places in 1983.

References

Houses on the National Register of Historic Places in Delaware
Greek Revival houses in Delaware
Houses completed in 1844
Houses in New Castle County, Delaware
National Register of Historic Places in New Castle County, Delaware